The 1980 Pepsi Grand Slam was a men's tennis tournament played on outdoor green clay courts at the Mission Hills Country Club in Boca Raton, Florida, United States It was an Association of Tennis Professionals (ATP) sanctioned special event that was not part of the 1980 Volvo Grand Prix circuit. It was the fifth edition of the tournament and was held from February 8 through February 10, 1980.  Björn Borg won his fourth consecutive singles title at the event and earned $150,000 first prize money.

Final

Singles
 Björn Borg defeated  Vitas Gerulaitis 6–1, 5–7, 6–1
 It was Borg's 1st singles title of the year and the 53rd of his career.

Draw

Third place match
 John McEnroe defeated  Guillermo Vilas 8–7(7–5)

References

External links
 ITF tournament edition details

Pepsi Grand Slam
Pepsi Grand Slam
Pepsi Grand Slam
Pepsi Grand Slam